The Hangzhou–Ruili Expressway, designated as G56 and commonly referred to as the Hangrui Expressway is an expressway in China that connects the cities of Hangzhou, Zhejiang, and Ruili, Yunnan, a city on the border with Burma. When complete, it will be  in length. Running through mountainous terrain, it is notable for its several tunnels and bridges, including the very high Duge Bridge, Puli Bridge and Dimuhe River Bridge.

The expressway is complete in the provinces of Zhejiang, Anhui, and Jiangxi. The entire expressway in the provinces of Hubei, Hunan, Guizhou, and Yunnan is under construction except for sections from Changde to Jishou in Hunan and from the Guizhou border to Baoshan in Yunnan.

At Ruili, there will be a border crossing to Muse, Myanmar and National Highway 3.

Route

Hangzhou, Huangshan, Jingdezhen, Jiujiang, Xianning, Yueyang, Changde, Jishou, Zunyi, Bijie, Liupanshui, Qujing, Kunming, Chuxiong, Dali, Ruili

Spurs
 G5611 Dali–Lijiang Expressway: connecting to Lijiang

See also
 Burma Road, whose path the G56 often follows

References

Chinese national-level expressways
Expressways in Zhejiang
Expressways in Jiangxi
Expressways in Anhui
Expressways in Hubei
Expressways in Hunan
Expressways in Guizhou
Expressways in Yunnan